Amy Rosenbaum is a former official in U.S. President Barack Obama's administration. She was his director of legislative affairs. and was policy director for Nancy Pelosi. She left government work in 2010 and returned in 2014. She is now an adjunct professor at Harvard University's Kennedy School and a fellow at the Center for American Progress. She has a B.A. from Cornell University and a PhD from Johns Hopkins University.

References

Cornell University alumni
Living people
Obama administration personnel
Year of birth missing (living people)